Caloctenus is a genus of wandering spiders first described by Eugen von Keyserling in 1877.

Species
 it contains six species:
Caloctenus abyssinicus Strand, 1917 – Ethiopia
Caloctenus aculeatus Keyserling, 1877 (type) – Colombia
Caloctenus albertoi Hazzi & Silva-Dávila, 2012 – Colombia
Caloctenus carbonera Silva-Dávila, 2004 – Venezuela
Caloctenus gracilitarsis Simon, 1897 – Venezuela
Caloctenus oxapampa Silva-Dávila, 2004 – Peru

References

Araneomorphae genera
Ctenidae
Spiders of Africa
Spiders of Asia
Taxa named by Eugen von Keyserling